Tacuarembó Airport  is an airport serving Tacuarembó, the capital of Tacuarembó Department in Uruguay.

The Tacuarembo non-directional beacon (Ident: TBO) and VOR-DME (Ident: TMB) are located on the field.

See also

Transport in Uruguay
List of airports in Uruguay

References

External links
OpenStreetMap - Tacuarembó
OurAirports - Tacuarembó Airport

Airports in Uruguay
Buildings and structures in Tacuarembó Department